W.A.K.O. World Championships 1983 were the fourth world kickboxing championships hosted by W.A.K.O. and were organized by British P.K.A. principal Mike Haig.  It was the second W.A.K.O. event to be held in London (the 1980 European championship was also held here) and was open to amateur male kickboxers only and featured two forms of kickboxing - Full-Contact and Semi-Contact.  By the end of the championships West Germany was the top nation in terms of medals, with US a close second and hosts Great Britain just behind in third.  The event was held at the Wembley Centre in London, England, UK on Saturday, 22 October 1983.

Men's Full-Contact Kickboxing
Full-Contact made a return to the world championships, having missed out at the last event in Milan, with more weight classes than ever before (nine), ranging from 57 kg/125.4 lbs to over 91 kg/+200.2 lbs, with all bouts fought under Full-Contact rules.  More detail on Full-Contact's rules-set can be found at the W.A.K.O. website, although be aware that the rules have changed since 1983.  Many of the weight classes were newly introduced with the 60, 63.5, 67, 71, 75, 80, 91 and over 91 kg divisions replacing the 63, 69, 74, 79, 84 and over 84 kg divisions used at the 1979 world championships.  The most notable winner was Ferdinand Mack who won his fourth gold medal at a W.A.K.O. championships.  By the end of the championships, West Germany was the strongest nation in Full-Contact, winning three golds and three silvers.

Men's Full-contact Kickboxing medals table

Men's Semi-Contact Kickboxing
Semi-Contact differed from Full-Contact in that fights were won by using skill, speed and technique to score points rather than by excessive force - more detail on Semi-Contact rules can be found at the official W.A.K.O. website, although be aware that the rules will have changed since 1983.  At London there were seven weight divisions in Semi-Contact (two less than Full-Contact) ranging from 57 kg/125.4 lbs to over 84 kg/+184.8 lbs.  By the end of the championships the US was easily the strongest nation in Semi-Contact, picking up four gold, two silver and two bronze medals.

Men's Semi-Contact Kickboxing medals table

Overall medals standing (top 5)

See also
List of WAKO Amateur World Championships
List of WAKO Amateur European Championships

References

External links
 WAKO World Association of Kickboxing Organizations Official Site

WAKO Amateur World Championships events
Kickboxing in the United Kingdom
1983 in kickboxing
Sport in the London Borough of Brent